Lorenzo Dow Mayes (September 12, 1847 – October 25, 1925) was an American lawyer. He was an unsuccessful candidate for justice of the New York Supreme Court in 1908. He was a candidate for Mayor of New York City in 1917 when he lost to John Francis Hylan.

Biography
He was born on September 12, 1847  in Lawrence County, Alabama to Patrick Henry Mayes and Mary Jane Thompson. His family moved to Johnson County, Arkansas in 1859. In 1861 they moved to Colorado County, Texas. Sometime after 1887 Lorenzo moved to Poughkeepsie, New York. He died on October 25, 1925.

References

1847 births
1925 deaths
19th-century American lawyers